Paraskevi "Voula" Papachristou (born 17 April 1989) is a Greek triple jumper and long jumper. She won two gold medals at the European Athletics U23 Championships and took the third place at the 2016 World indoor Championships. She was removed from the Greek team for the 2012 London Olympics by the Greek Olympic Committee after making a racist comment online. At the 2016 Summer Olympics' final in Rio de Janeiro, she took the 8th place. In 2018 she was the European Champion in Berlin with a jump of 14,60 metres.

Career
Born in Athens, Papachristou won the bronze medal at the 2008 World Junior Championships. She competed in the 2009 European Indoor Championships and went through the qualification round with a jump of 14.47 metres. However, in the final, she was injured and failed to register a valid jump. After taking the bronze medal at the 2009 Mediterranean Games, she competed at the 2009 World Championships without reaching the final round. She won the gold medal at the 2009 European U23 Championships that season. During the indoor season of 2011, she competed in the qualifying rounds of the 2011 European Athletics Indoor Championships without reaching the final. She achieved a personal best of 14.72 metres in June 2011 in Chania – a mark which ranks her third among Greek female triple jumpers, after Hrysopiyi Devetzi and Paraskevi Tsiamita. This jump was also the second best ever achieved by a European under-23 athlete after Anna Pyatykh's record of 14.79 m. She successfully defended her gold medal at the 2011 European U23 Championships in Ostrava, Czech Republic.

Expulsion from 2012 Olympics
Papachristou was to compete in the 2012 Summer Olympics, but was expelled from the Greek team on 25 July 2012 after she posted on her Twitter account a message which has been translated to: "With so many Africans in Greece... the West Nile mosquitoes will at least eat homemade food!!!" This was in reference to a small outbreak of West Nile virus in Greece that had sickened at least five and killed one person.  The tweet, for which she later apologized for being an unfortunate and tasteless joke, was condemned by the Greek Olympic Committee as contrary to Olympic values and ideals.

2013–2019
In May 2013, the Greek athletics federation suspended her athletic benefits effective from 4 January 2013, stating that the athlete's benefits would be reinstated if she began training with an approved coach and resumed high-level competition. Papachristou took a break from track and returned in 2015  - after the birth of her daughter - with George Pomaski as a trainer.

She won the bronze medal at the 2016 World Indoor Championships in Portland, as well as at the European Championships in Amsterdam. At the Summer Olympics in Rio de Janeiro, she took the eighth place. At the 2018 European Championships in Berlin she won the gold medal. The following year she took the second place at the European Indoor Championships in Glasgow.

Competition record

Personal bests

References

External links
IAAF profile

1989 births
Living people
Greek female triple jumpers
Athletes from Athens
Athletes (track and field) at the 2016 Summer Olympics
Olympic athletes of Greece
European Athletics Championships medalists
Mediterranean Games bronze medalists for Greece
Mediterranean Games medalists in athletics
Athletes (track and field) at the 2009 Mediterranean Games
Athletes (track and field) at the 2020 Summer Olympics
Greek European Athletics champions (track and field)